Harpreet Sandhu may refer to:

 Harpreet Sandhu (actor) (born 1979), actor and filmmaker
 Harpreet Sandhu (politician), Indian American politician and community activist